Ebbe Wallén (January 2, 1917 – July 19, 2009) was a Swedish bobsledder who competed in the 1956 Winter Olympics.

Together with Olle Axelsson, Sune Skagerling, and Gunnar Åhs he was a crew member of Sweden I who finished 16th in the four-man event.

He was born in Väddö and grew up in Virserum.

External links
1956 bobsleigh four-man results
Ebbe Wallén's profile at Sports Reference.com

1917 births
2009 deaths
Swedish male bobsledders
Olympic bobsledders of Sweden
Bobsledders at the 1956 Winter Olympics
20th-century Swedish people